Nicholas Dietrich, Baron of Ottendorf, was a German mercenary who was paid on commission by the newly formed Continental Congress to gather and raise an independent corps in the continental army on December 5, 1776.

Dietrich had trouble properly organizing Ottendorf's Corps, and as a result George Washington replaced him with Lieutenant Colonel Armand on July 11, 1777. The Corps was scattered, some of it having been put under Armand's command while others of it followed Baron Dietrich. By 1781 the Baron and those that remained with him eventually joined under the banner of the British Army.

External links
 Library of Congress, Journals of the Continental Congress, 1774–1789, Page 1007 
 Baron Ottendorf to Clinton August 15, 1781

Dragoons
Barons of Germany
Continental Army officers from Germany